Bahrain Financial Harbour (commonly abbreviated as BFH) is a waterfront commercial development project located on the northern shore of Manama, the capital city of Bahrain. Costing $1.5 billion and covering an area of 380,000 square metres, the two main Harbour Towers were officially opened in May 2007. As a result of the Great Recession, the project suffered numerous delays for much of the next decade before construction finally resumed in 2016.

Overview
The commercial complex is located on the northern shoreline of Manama, adjacent to the King Faisal Highway which links Manama to Saudi Arabia via the King Fahd Causeway. The majority of the project, like the nearby Bahrain Bay, is being constructed on reclaimed land on the former site of the Manama pier.

Construction of the Bahrain Financial Harbour started in 2003 and the two main Harbour Towers were completed in May 2007. However, construction of the rest of the project including the Bahrain Performance Centre, residential Diamond Tower and Villamar apartment buildings was delayed largely due to the Great Recession.

The BFH project consists of multiple construction phases such as:

Harbour Towers
The towers provide a total of 100,000 square metres of office space.

Harbour Gate
Also called Harbour Mall (harbour), it is a six-storey building that houses the Bahrain Stock Exchange and various investment firms. It has approximately 22,000 square metres of retail space and is connected to both Harbour Towers at the second floor.

Harbour Heights
The Harbour Heights Towers (formerly Villamar) are 3 residential skyscrapers located to the north of the Harbour Towers. The towers are 54, 43 and 52 storeys high and boast 437 apartments, 52 villas, and 17 penthouses in addition to a health club and restaurants. With a cost of $650 million, construction began in 2006 and was originally scheduled to be completed by 2009. However, repeated delays saw the project being put on hold in October 2011 due to the Bahrain uprising, the global financial crisis, and a liquidity problem at the parent company, Gulf Holding Company. Construction briefly restarted in 2012 when it was estimated to have been halfway done before construction ceased again. The Bahraini government in 2015 formed a committee to oversee stalled projects in the country. In 2016, Gulf Finance House Financial Group announced that work on the towers would recommence in the same year.

Harbour Row
The project consists of a row of luxury homes alongside a commercial waterfront promenade. Construction of the $150 million project started in 2016 after its building permit was issued.

Unfinished projects
 Bahrain Performance Center
 Diamond Tower
 Dhow Harbour
 Residential North
 Residential South

Tenants

 BNP Paribas
 Khaleeji Commercial Bank
 Gulf Finance House
 Ministry of Transportation – Headquarters on Floors 9, 32, and 33, Land Transport office on Floor 32
Newton Legal
Norton Rose
Baker & McKenzie
Al-Tamimi & Company
Ministry of Industry, Commerce & Tourism
PricewaterhouseCoopers

Gallery

See also
List of tallest buildings and structures in Bahrain
List of twin buildings and structures

References

External links

2004 establishments in Bahrain

Commercial buildings completed in 2009

Buildings and structures in Manama
Neighborhoods of Manama
Towers in Bahrain
Twin towers